SMOS may refer to:

 Soil Moisture and Ocean Salinity satellite, launched by the European Space Agency in fall 2009
 Special Minister of State, a minister in Australia

de:SMOS
it:SMOS
fi:SMOS